Autocharis seyrigalis is a moth in the family Crambidae. It is found in Madagascar.

References

Odontiinae
Moths described in 1956
Moths of Madagascar